Joseph Novoa (José Ramón Novoa or José R. Novoa) is a Venezuelan-Uruguayan film director and executive producer. He is married to the director and scriptwriter Elia K. Schneider and fathered the film director Joel Novoa.

Biography 
Joseph Novoa was born in Montevideo, Uruguay on August 22, 1950. He studied architecture in Uruguay but his real path was the arts. He started the entertainment career at El Teatro Circular of Uruguay. Following his dream he moved to Paris to study Performance Arts in the L'École Internationale de Théâtre Jacques Lecoq. In Paris he founded the theatre group El Circo and organized and performed different plays. He got a scholarship from the Danish Government to work with Eugenio Barba Directing Te Odin Teatret (Holstebro, Denmark). He lived in Europe for a few years where he Directed and Produced plays that were presented in Theater Festivals like Festival d'Avignon and Festival Nancy. Some of the plays were "The night of the Assassins", "Masks" and "The Exile of the Sun".

In Venezuela he became the Associate Director of the International Theater Festival (Theatre of Nations - UNESCO) in 1978 and 1982. He received the Critven Award (Critic's Prize for best lighting) for the play "Gaz". He studied film at the New York University and Television at the New School of Arts.

As a film director, he released his debut long feature "Agony" in 1984 at the Montreal Film Festival and the Indian Film Festival. His movie "Assassins for Hire" (Sicario) was released in 1994 and was in theaters for 35 weeks becoming one of the bigger blockbusters in Venezuela. It received 27 awards from international film festivals and was the official selection from Venezuela to the Oscars in 1995.

His third movie "Devil's Gold" (Oro Diablo, 1999) was another blockbuster in Venezuela and won 3 international awards becoming the official selection for the Oscars in Venezuela's behalf. "The Boss" (2006) and "A Distant Place" (2009) received good critics from national and international press. A distant Place went to different festivals in Europe, America and Asia. This is the only Venezuelan movie shoot with Panavision cameras in cinemascope 35mm. "Alone" (2014) was his sixth movie as a Director.

He worked as a Producer in some Venezuelan feature films:  Glue Sniffer (1999), Step Forward (Punto y Raya, 2004), Un-Authorized (2009), God's Slave (2013) and Tamara that is going to be released this 2015. Internationally he produced In This Tricky Life (Uruguay, 2001), Be Happy (Chile, 2004), Encarnacion (Argentina, 2007), Polvo Nuestro Que Estas en los Cielos (Argentina, 2008), El Premio (Peru, 2009), Verdades Verdaderas La Vida de Estela (Argentina, 2011) y Cuchillos en el Cielo (Peru, 2013).

His films had participated in more than hundred International Film Festivals an received more than 80 important awards. The most recent was the SEGIB Award by Ibermedia for his last production Tamara.

He is member by invitation of the Spanish Academy of Arts and Cinematographic Sciences (Goya Awards). He was the founder and first VP of the Board of Trustees of the Iberoamerican Federation of Cinematographers (FIPCA), president of the Federation of Film Producers in Venezuela (CAVEPROL) and was a member of the board of National Autonomous Center of Film in Venezuela (CNAC).

He moved to Los Angeles California and from there he is developing new projects using English as the speaking language. Some of his projects are the featured films Bullet Lullaby and Pando, the documentary Music and Action and a TV Show. As Producer he is working n the movie Unfit Directed by Elia K. Schneider.

Filmography

Feature films 
 Tamara (2015 | Producer-Editor)
 Alone (Solo, 2014 | Producer-Director)
 God's Slave (Esclavo de Dios, 2013 | Producer)
 A Distant Place (Un Lugar Lejano, 2009 | Producer-Director)
 An-Authorized (Des-Autorizados, 2007 | Producer)
 The Boss  (El Don, 2006 | Producer-Director) 
 Step Forward (Punto y Raya, 2004 | Producer) OSCAR-Academy Awards Entry- Best Foreign Film
 Devil Gold (Oro Diablo - Garimpeiros, 2000 | Producer-Director-) OSCAR-Academy Awards Entry- Best Foreign Film
 Glue Sniffer (Huelepega, 1999 | Producer-Editor) OSCAR-Academy Awards Entry- Best Foreign Film
 Assassin's for Hire (Sicario, 1994 | Producer-Director-Editor) OSCAR-Academy Awards Entry- Best Foreign Film
 Agony (Agonia, 1985 | Writer-Producer-Director-Editor)

Short films 
 Borrowed Lands (Tierras Prestadas. 1981 | Producer-Editor)
 Pedro Navaja (1980 | Writer-Producer-Director-Editor)
 The Big World (El Gran Mundo, 1979 | Writer-Producer-Director-Editor)

International coproductions 
 El Premio (2009) Directed by Alberto Chicho Durant, Peru.
 Encarnación (2007) Directed by Anahi Berneri, Argentina.
 Be Happy  (2004) Directed by Gonzalo Justiniano, Chile.
 In This Tricky Life (En la Puta Vida, 2002) Directed by Beatriz Flores Silva, Uruguay.

Awards

See also 
 List of Venezuelan films

External links 
 

Venezuelan film directors
Uruguayan film directors
1950 births
Living people